The Turkmenistan Basketball Federation ('TBF) is the governing body of basketball in Turkmenistan. The TBF is a member of FIBA and FIBA Asia.  The association founded in 1998, represents basketball with public authorities as well as with national and international sports organizations and as such with Turkmenistan in international competitions. It also defends the moral and material interests of basketball in Turkmenistan.

The federation is responsible for the Turkmenistan men's national basketball team and the Turkmenistan women's national basketball team and their Under-age teams.

References

External links 
 Official website of Turkmenistan Basketball Federation
Official website of Turkmenistan Basketball Federation
 FIBA

Basketball in Turkmenistan
Basketball governing bodies in Asia
Basketball
1998 establishments in Turkmenistan
Sports organizations established in 1998